Kingston upon Hull Central was a parliamentary constituency in the city of Kingston upon Hull in East Yorkshire.  It returned one Member of Parliament to the House of Commons of the Parliament of the United Kingdom.

The constituency was created for the 1885 general election, and abolished for the 1955 general election.
It was then re-created for the February 1974 general election, and abolished again for the 1983 general election. Under the proposed 2018 Boundary Commission review, this seat was set to be reinstated for the 2020 general election, replacing the seat of Hull North.

Boundaries
1885–1918: The Municipal Borough of Kingston-upon-Hull wards of Paragon and Queen's, and part of Central ward.

1918–1950: The County Borough of Kingston-upon-Hull wards of Beverley, East Central, Myton, Paragon, West Central, and Whitefriars.

1950–1955: The County Borough of Kingston-upon-Hull wards of Albert, Botanic, Coltman, East Central, Myton, North Newington, Paragon, South Newington, and West Central.

1974–1983: The County Borough of Kingston-upon-Hull wards of Avenue, Beverley, Botanic, Greenwood, Myton, Newland, and University.

Members of Parliament

MPs 1885–1955

MPs 1974–1983

Elections

Elections in the 1880s

Elections in the 1890s

Elections in the 1900s

Elections in the 1910s

Elections in the 1920s

Elections in the 1930s

Elections in the 1940s 
General Election 1939–40:

Another general election was required to take place before the end of 1940. The political parties had been making preparations for an election to take place from 1939 and by the end of this year, the following candidates had been selected; 
Labour: Walter Windsor
Conservative: Diana Spearman

Elections in the 1950s

Elections in the 1970s

References 

Politics of Kingston upon Hull
Parliamentary constituencies in Yorkshire and the Humber (historic)
Constituencies of the Parliament of the United Kingdom established in 1885
Constituencies of the Parliament of the United Kingdom disestablished in 1955
Constituencies of the Parliament of the United Kingdom established in 1974
Constituencies of the Parliament of the United Kingdom disestablished in 1983